Mount Vito is a bare mountain of , in western Wisconsin Range, standing   northeast of Mount Frontz along the east side of Reedy Glacier. Mapped by United States Geological Survey (USGS) from surveys and U.S. Navy air photos, 1960–64. Named by Advisory Committee on Antarctic Names (US-ACAN) for John Vito, electronics technician, Byrd Station winter party, 1961.

References

Mountains of Marie Byrd Land